In Greek mythology, Aristodeme (Ancient Greek: Ἀριστοδήμη) was a Trojan princess as one of the daughters of King Priam of Troy by an unknown woman.

Note

References 

 Apollodorus, The Library with an English Translation by Sir James George Frazer, F.B.A., F.R.S. in 2 Volumes, Cambridge, MA, Harvard University Press; London, William Heinemann Ltd. 1921. ISBN 0-674-99135-4. Online version at the Perseus Digital Library. Greek text available from the same website.
Trojans
Princesses in Greek mythology